Maciek ("Michael" or "Mike") Gracz (pronounced Grahtz) (born October 23, 1980 in Warsaw) is a Polish professional poker player, based in Raleigh, North Carolina.

Gracz learned poker from his father and played regularly whilst studying at North Carolina State University.

Gracz's first major victory was in the $5,000 no limit hold'em championship event in the 2004 Trump Classic in Atlantic City. He won over the field of 155 entrants to take home the $295,275 first prize.

On  March 19, 2005, he won the World Poker Tour (WPT) PartyPoker.com Million IV Cruise event (the largest limit hold'em tournament in history) and the $1,500,000 first prize, defeating a final table that included Paul Darden.

Three months later, he won his first World Series of Poker bracelet in the $1,000 no limit hold'em w/ rebuys event, scooping the first prize of $594,460.

As of 2010, his total live tournament winnings exceed $3,000,000. His 7 cashes at the WSOP account for $764,897 of those winnings.

Gracz has served as a frequent commentator for the Fox Sports Net poker tournament program Poker Dome Challenge.

World Series of Poker bracelets

References

External links
 Official site
 World Poker Tour profile
 Hendon Mob tournament results

1980 births
Living people
Polish poker players
World Poker Tour winners
World Series of Poker bracelet winners
Poker commentators
North Carolina State University alumni